Malwina Smarzek-Godek, née Smarzek (born 3 June 1996) is a Polish volleyball player. She is a part of the Poland women's national volleyball team.

She participated in the 2014 FIVB Volleyball World Grand Prix.
On club level she played for Legionovia SA in 2014.

Awards

Clubs
 2016-17 Polish Volleyball League –  Champion, with KPS Chemik Police
 2017-18 Polish Volleyball League –  Champion, with KPS Chemik Police

Individual
 2019 Montreux Volley Masters "Most Valuable Player"
 2019 Montreux Volley Masters "Best Opposite Spiker"

References

External links
 Profile at FIVB.org

1996 births
Living people
Polish women's volleyball players
People from Łask
Serie A1 (women's volleyball) players
Polish expatriate sportspeople in Italy